Herbert Rex Tilley (16 February 1929 – 14 May 2016) was an English footballer who played as a wing half. He made 154 appearances in the Football League for Plymouth Argyle and Swindon Town.

He began his career in non-league football with Chippenham Town before signing professional forms with Plymouth Argyle. He made his debut in March 1953 and was a regular fixture in the team for the next five years. Tilley returned to Wiltshire in 1958 to sign for Swindon Town and stayed for two years before ending his career back in non-league football with Trowbridge Town.

References

1929 births
2016 deaths
Sportspeople from Swindon
English footballers
Association football wing halves
Chippenham Town F.C. players
Plymouth Argyle F.C. players
Swindon Town F.C. players
Trowbridge Town F.C. players
English Football League players